In Greek mythology, Corus or Koros (Ancient Greek: Κόρος) was the spirit (daemon) and personification of surfeit and disdain. He was said to be the son of Hybris (Arrogance), daughter of Dyssebeia (Impiety).

Notes

References 

 Herodotus, The Histories with an English translation by A. D. Godley. Cambridge. Harvard University Press. 1920. . Online version at the Topos Text Project. Greek text available at Perseus Digital Library.
 Pindar, Odes translated by Diane Arnson Svarlien. 1990. Nemean Odes: Online version at the Perseus Digital Library. Olympian Odes: Online version at the Perseus Digital Library.
 Pindar, The Odes of Pindar including the Principal Fragments with an Introduction and an English Translation by Sir John Sandys, Litt.D., FBA. Cambridge, MA., Harvard University Press; London, William Heinemann Ltd. 1937. Nemean Odes: Greek text available at the Perseus Digital Library. Olympian Odes: Greek text available at the Perseus Digital Library.

Greek gods
Personifications in Greek mythology
Daimons